The 2011–12 Kuwaiti Premier League season was the 50th since its establishment. The season started on 30 December with the regular league season finishing on 1 June. A relegation play-off match was needed to end the campaign on the 5 and 8 June.

Teams
Al Sahel were relegated to the Kuwaiti Division One league after finishing bottom in the 2010–11 season. They were replaced by Al Shabab, back in the top flight for the first time since relegation in the 2008–09 campaign.

League standing

Promotion/relegation playoff

1st Leg

2nd Leg

Al Naser secured place in the top flight after winning 6–1 on aggregate.

References 

 

Kuwait Premier League seasons
Kuwaiti Premier League
1